Roderick Anderson (born April 8, 1972) is an American former professional basketball player. He attended Angelina College for two years before transferring to the NCAA Division I, spending two years at Texas. In 1994–95 he led the NCAA in steals, averaging 3.4 per game.

College career
A Baton Rouge, Louisiana native, Anderson joined Angelina College in Lufkin, Texas in 1991. During his first season he averaged 29.3 points, 7 rebounds and 3.5 assists per game, and was named a first-team junior college All-American at the end of his freshman season. In his sophomore season with the Angelina Roadrunners, Anderson posted averages of 28.6 points, 9 rebounds and 8.3 assists per game, and again earned first-team All-American honors. He scored 47 points in 1993 against Navarro College, an all-time record for Angelina. He also holds the record for most free throws in a single game with 25. In 2015 Anderson was inducted in the Angelina Hall of Fame.

Anderson's performances at JUCO level earned him attention from three Division I programs: Arkansas, Cincinnati and Texas. In April 1993 he signed with Texas. In his first year with the Longhorns he started 13 games of 29 played,  and ranked second on the team in assists per game (behind B. J. Tyler) and fourth in points per game with 12.3, playing a total of 824 minutes over 29 games (28.4 per game). In his senior season Anderson was named co-captain with Terrence Rencher and improved his averages to 7 assists and 20.3 points per game, ranking first on the team in assists and second in scoring (behind Rencher), playing a total of 1023 minutes (34.1 per game). On February 11, 1995 he tied a Texas record for most free throws in one half with 12 against Texas A&M. His 7 assists per game ranked him second in the SWC behind Nelson Haggerty of Baylor, and he led the nation in steals per game with 3.4 (101 total). At the end of the season he was a consensus First-team All-SWC selection, and he was named the team co-MVP together with Rencher.

He finished his career at Texas as the 9th player of all-time for assists with a total of 362, and 8th for total steals with 165.

College statistics

Junior college

|-
| align="left" | 1991–92
| align="left" | Angelina
| 33 ||  ||  || .430 || – || .800 || 7.0 || 3.5 || – || – || 29.3
|-
| align="left" | 1992–93
| align="left" | Angelina
| 32 ||  ||  || .450 || – || .800 || 9.0 || 8.3 || – || – || 28.6
|-
| align="left" | Career
| align="left" |
| 65 ||  || || .440 || – || .800 || 8.0 || 5.9 || – || – || 29.0
|-

Division I

|-
| align="left" | 1993–94
| align="left" | Texas
| 29 || 13 || 28.4 || .455 || .324 || .712 || 3.2 || 5.2 || 2.2 || 0.0 || 12.3
|-
| align="left" | 1994–95
| align="left" | Texas
| 30 ||  || 34.1 || .447 || .371 || .705 || 2.7 || 7.0 || style="background:#cfecec;" | 3.4* || 0.0 || 20.3
|-
| align="left" | Career
| align="left" |
| 59 ||  || 31.3 || .450 || .355 || .707 || 2.9 || 6.1 || 2.8 || 0.0 || 16.3
|-

Professional career
After the end of his senior season at Texas, Anderson was automatically eligible for the 1995 NBA draft, but he was not selected by any franchise. He was drafted in the 2nd round (17th overall) of the 1995 CBA draft by the Quad City Thunder in September 1995. In October he participated in a preseason rookie camp for the Cleveland Cavaliers, but was cut on October 16, 1995. He then joined the Fort Wayne Fury for the 1995–96 CBA season, and he played only 3 games with the team, averaging 3.7 points, 2.7 assists and 0.3 steals in 12.3 minutes per game.

In 1996 he joined the Portland Wave of the United States Basketball League, being waived in May 1997. Later in 1997 Anderson tried out for the Galveston Storm of the Southwest Basketball League, but did not make the final roster. He then spent the 1998–99 season with the Magic City Snowbears of the International Basketball Association. In 1999 he moved to Sweden in Europe, and signed for the 08 Stockholm Human Rights, where he spent the 1999–2000 season. In 2000 he moved to the Czech Republic and signed for BK Opava, where he averaged 8.2 points, 5.2 rebounds and 2.9 assists in the 2000–01 National Basketball League season. Anderson spent the 2001–02 season with Sloboda Dita, and played 22 games in the ABA League, posting averages of 8.7 points, 3.2 rebounds, 1.2 assists and a league-leading 2.4 steals per game. In 2002 he briefly joined Londrina in Brazil before being waived.

References

External links
Stats at Proballers.com
Profile at DraftExpress.com
College stats at Sports-Reference.com

1972 births
Living people
08 Stockholm Human Rights players
African-American basketball players
American expatriate basketball people in Bosnia and Herzegovina
American expatriate basketball people in Brazil
American expatriate basketball people in the Czech Republic
American expatriate basketball people in Sweden
American men's basketball players
Angelina Roadrunners men's basketball players
Basketball players from Baton Rouge, Louisiana
BK Opava players
Fort Wayne Fury players
OKK Sloboda Tuzla players
Point guards
Texas Longhorns men's basketball players
United States Basketball League players
21st-century African-American sportspeople
20th-century African-American sportspeople